WWSO-LP is a Children's-formatted broadcast radio station licensed to and serving Hillsville, Virginia. WWSO-LP is owned and operated by Hillsville Radio for Kids.

References

External links
 

2015 establishments in Virginia
Radio stations established in 2015
WSO-LP
WSO-LP
Children's radio stations in the United States